Thiomorpholine, C4H9NS, is a heterocyclic compound containing nitrogen and sulfur. It can be considered a thio analog of morpholine.

References

 
Foul-smelling chemicals